Varpay-e Sofla (also Romanized as Varpāy-e Soflá; also known as Varapā-ye Pā’īn and Varpā-ye Soflá) is a village in Kuhestan Rural District, in the Central District of Nain County, Isfahan Province, Iran. At the 2006 census, its population was 13, in 5 families.

References 

Populated places in Nain County